Il-yeon (or Iryeon; 1206–1289) was a Buddhist monk and All-Enlightened National Preceptor during the Goryeo Dynasty of Korea.  His birth name was either Kim Gyeong-myeong or Jeon Gyeon-myeong, and his courtesy name was Hoe-yeon.

He became a monk at Muryangsa Temple at the age of nine, and passed the Seon national examination at 22; at 54 he was given the rank of Great Teacher.  When he was seventy-eight, King Chungnyeol offered him a position of rank and tried to make him National Preceptor, but Iryeon declined.  The king again appointed him National Preceptor, and Iryeon came down to the capital Kaesong (then Gaegyeong), but soon returned to the mountains on the pretext that his aged mother was sick.  On the eighth day of the seventh month in 1289, he held an interview with various monks, and then died.

Iryeon is known as a prolific writer, and according to the inscription on his tombstone he wrote some 80 volumes on Buddhist topics.  But today only one book of his survives:  the Samguk Yusa, which is not mentioned in the inscription at all.

See also
List of Goryeo people
History of Korea

1206 births
1289 deaths
Goryeo Buddhist monks
Historians of Korea
13th-century historians
13th-century Korean calligraphers